WBTG-FM (106.3 FM, "Gospel Power 106") is an American radio station licensed to serve the community of Sheffield, Alabama. The station was founded by Paul Slatton and is owned by Slatton & Associates Broadcasters, Inc.

Programming
WBTG-FM airs a Southern Gospel music format.

History
Founded as WBTG on February 1, 1978, the station was assigned the WBTG-FM call letters by the Federal Communications Commission on December 17, 1987, when its newly acquired sister station at 1290 AM changed callsigns from WHCM to WBTG.

References

External links
WBTG-FM official website

Southern Gospel radio stations in the United States
Radio stations established in 1978
BTG-FM
1978 establishments in Alabama